"Port of Lonely Hearts" is a song written and originally recorded by Johnny Cash.

The song was recorded by Cash at Sun Records in 1955. Sun released it as a single (Sun 347, with "Mean-Eyed Cat" on the opposite side) in October 1960 when Cash had already left the label for Columbia.

Composition and background 
According to C. Eric Banister's Johnny Cash FAQ: All That's Left to Know About the Man in Black,

References 

Johnny Cash songs
1960 singles
Songs written by Johnny Cash
Sun Records singles
1960 songs